H&H Bagels is a  bagel company in New York City that has been described as "classic," "famous," and "iconic." The original store has closed, but five retail locations on the Upper East Side and Upper West Side of Manhattan and at John F. Kennedy International Airport, LaGuardia Airport, and Moynihan Train Hall are currently open daily. With these stores and its nationwide shipping and wholesale businesses, H&H Bagels is one of the largest bagel manufacturers in New York City.

History

The business was started in 1972 when Puerto Rican Helmer Toro and his brother-in-law Hector Hernandez (hence "H&H"), bought Midtown Bagels at Broadway and 80th Street for $5,000 ($ in 2018 dollar terms) in cash and $50,000 ($ in 2018 dollar terms) in a loan. Toro eventually assumed full control of the business.  In 1974 Toro opened H&H Midtown Bagels East on the Upper East Side of Manhattan.

In 1979 H&H went bankrupt for the first time which resulted in a new group taking over ownership of the Upper East Side H&H location while Toro retained ownership of the Upper West Side location.

In 1993 Toro moved his bakery to 46th Street at 12th Avenue in Hell's Kitchen, although his primary storefront remained on the Upper West Side.

On November 18, 2009, Manhattan District Attorney Robert Morgenthau announced the indictment and arrest of Helmer Toro for stealing, withholding taxes and evading unemployment insurance taxes. The indictment alleged that between July 2003 and April 2009, Toro failed to pay $369,000 withheld from H&H employees.  In May 2010 he pleaded guilty to grand larceny, and was sentenced to pay restitution of more than $540,000 and to a jail term, which he served over the course of 50 weekends from June 2010 to July 2011.

Toro's portion of H&H filed for bankruptcy protection in February 2011 in an effort to maintain its manufacturing facility in Secaucus, New Jersey, but ultimately that facility was sold at auction in October 2011.  The West 46th and West 80th retail locations closed in January 2012. The final days and collapse of Toro's portion of H&H are chronicled in The Rise and Fall of H&H Bagels. Marc Zirogiannis wrote this business memoir on his experiences as an advisor to the owner, Helmer Toro.

In the meantime, H&H Bagels on the Upper East Side continued its normal operations. In 2014, a new CEO joined the company, implementing a new "national" approach. H&H Bagels opened a new retail location on the Upper West Side in 2016. In 2017, it launched its wholesale business supplying bagels to retailers around the world. In 2019, H&H Bagels opened locations at JFK Airport and LaGuardia Airport. It opened a Moynihan Train Hall location in 2021. 
During the 2020-21 COVID-19 pandemic, H&H Bagels' nationwide shipping and wholesale businesses grew 500% and 400% respectively. In August 2021, it launched a national franchise program, with plans to open retail locations in the top 50 U.S. markets. In April 2022, H&H renovated its Upper West Side store to serve as a flagship for its planned franchise operations. In September 2022, it secured funding to support its anticipated growth.

Retail locations

Current
 Upper East Side (2nd Avenue between East 80th and East 81st)
H&H Bagels at 1551 2nd Avenue between East 80th and East 81st streets on the Upper East Side.
 Upper West Side (Columbus Avenue between West 85th and West 86th)
In November 2016, H&H Bagels opened a second location on the Upper West Side. It was renovated as H&H's flagship in 2022.
 JFK Airport
In 2019, H&H Bagels opened a location in JFK Airport, Terminal 5.
 LaGuardia Airport
In 2019, H&H Bagels opened a location in LaGuardia Airport, Terminal D.
 Moynihan Train Hall
This location opened in 2021.

Former
 Upper West Side (West 80th St)
Opened in 1972, this was the original location of H&H Bagels. It was open to the public 24 hours a day. Bagels were produced at the location at nearly all times of the day and night.  It was closed by New York City marshals on June 29, 2011.
 Hell's Kitchen (West 46th St)
The H&H location at 639 West 46th Street also held a manufacturing plant. This location was also open 24 hours a day. The property was sold in December 2011, but the company continued operating until evicted in January 2012.

In popular culture
On December 18, 1997, NBC aired the Seinfeld episode entitled "The Strike," in which Cosmo Kramer returns to work at H&H Bagels after supposedly having been on strike for 12 years. He eventually strikes again, returns again, then is fired for dropping his gum into the bagel dough. The episode is also famous for introducing Frank Costanza's alternative holiday, "Festivus for the Rest of Us!"

References

External links
 H&H Bagels

Bagel companies
Food manufacturers of the United States
Restaurants in Manhattan
Restaurants established in 1972
Upper East Side
1972 establishments in New York City